Marla Shapiro CM, is a Canadian medical doctor, best known as a health journalist for CTV News Channel and formerlyThe Globe and Mail. Her reports on health and medical issues have also aired on Canada AM and on CTV's daytime talk show Balance: Television for Living Well. She is seen regularly on CTV News Channel.

Born in Montreal, Quebec, she is a graduate of McGill University and a professor in the Department of Family and Community Medicine at the University of Toronto. Shapiro is also the founding editor of ParentsCanada magazine. She was diagnosed with breast cancer in 2004 and was featured in a television special about her experience. She is the author of Life in the Balance: My Journey with Breast Cancer (HarperCollins Publishers, 2006).

She was named a Member of the Order of Canada in 2015.

References

External links 
 CTV website biography
 

Canadian columnists
Canadian general practitioners
Canadian television journalists
Journalists from Montreal
Journalists from Toronto
Living people
McGill University Faculty of Medicine alumni
Academic staff of the University of Toronto
Canadian women television journalists
Canadian women columnists
Members of the Order of Canada
CTV Television Network people
Jewish Canadian journalists
Year of birth missing (living people)